The 2017–18 Basketligan season was the 25th season of the Basketligan, the top tier basketball league on Sweden. The season started on 6 October 2017 and finished in May 2018. Luleå was the defending champion, but failed to repeat as they lost in the last game of the finals to Norrköping Dolphins, that achieved their fifth title ever.

Competition format
The participating teams first played a conventional round-robin schedule with every team playing each opponent four times for a total of 28 games. The top six teams qualified for the championship playoffs.

Teams

After the end of the 2016–17 season, Malbas decided to not continue playing at Basketligan.

Regular season

Standings

Playoffs

Bracket

Quarterfinals

|}

Semifinals
Seeded teams played legs 1, 3, 5 and 7 at home.

|}

Finals
Seeded team played legs 1, 3, 5 and 7 at home.

|}

Clubs in European competitions

References

External links
Official Basketligan website

Basketligan seasons
Sweden
Basketligan